Maité Machado Palma (born 14 August 1998) is a Luxembourger footballer who plays as a forward for Dames Ligue 1 club Entente Differdingen-Luna and formerly the Luxembourg women's national team.

International career
Machado made her senior debut for Luxembourg on 26 June 2016 during a 6–0 friendly win against United Arab Emirates.

References

1998 births
Living people
Women's association football forwards
Luxembourgian women's footballers
Luxembourg women's international footballers